Thomas P. Flanagan (died 7 October 1980) was as Irish civil engineer who served for three terms in Seanad Éireann.

In 1961, he was elected to the 10th Seanad by the Industrial and Commercial Panel, which re-elected him in 1965 to the 11th Seanad. The Taoiseach, Jack Lynch, nominated him to the 12th Seanad. He did not contest the 1973 election to the 13th Seanad.

References

Year of birth missing
1980 deaths
Independent members of Seanad Éireann
Members of the 10th Seanad
Members of the 11th Seanad
Members of the 12th Seanad
Nominated members of Seanad Éireann